Petra Majdič (born 22 December 1979) is a Slovenian former cross-country skier. Her best results came in classic style races. She won twenty-four World Cup races, twenty in sprint races, but she also won a marathon (30 km race) in Trondheim in 2009. She is the first Slovenian cross-country skier to win a World Cup race, the first to get a medal at the World Championships and the first to get an Olympic medal. With 20 wins, Majdič is the second-most successful sprinter in FIS Cross-Country World Cup history and with 24 wins in total she's the fourth-most successful World Cup competitor of all time.

Career

She first appeared in World Cup on 9 January 1999 in Novo mesto, where she ended 10 km classic as 69th. In 2000, she won her first point in Falun with 30th place in 10 km freestyle. She showed talent for sprint events a year later in Asiago, where she earned her first podium for a 3rd-place finish in 1.5 km freestyle sprint. But real breakthrough came late for Majdič; after achieving two more podium finishes in 2002, she struggled for four years to make a major progress. Cross-country skiing was a marginal sport in Slovenia at that time and she was often frustrated about her training conditions and especially about her skis. As a skier from outside the World Cup elite and from a low-ranked country, she was unable to get the same quality skis as her competitors. The only way forward was even more hard work, as only top results could provide her with a chance to get equal terms with others. Her first victory came at the end of successful 2006 season in 1 km classic sprint of Drammen. First win, 3rd place in 45 km classic marathon of Mora and 9th place overall put Majdič in the spotlight for the first time, after so many years of hard work and little payback. She was recognized as the best female athlete in Slovenia and in the 2007 season she was finally able to compete on top skis and with an excellent support team, including a new coach and ski service team. She won three races and grabbed three more podium finishes to end season as 4th overall, 2nd in sprint and 8th in distance. Additionally, she earned a silver in the individual sprint at the 2007 FIS Nordic World Ski Championships. In the 2008 season, Majdič won her first World Cup title for sprints. In the 2009 season, she profiled herself as a serial winner, winning first four sprints of the season and eight sprints all together, but modified World Cup Finale rules prevented her from winning the World Cup overall. She won her second World Cup title for sprints, however, with a record 879 points and a record 409 points margin ahead of second-placed Arianna Follis.

2010 Winter Olympics

During the warm-up for the 1.4 km classic sprint on 17 February in the 2010 Olympics she skied off-course, down a bank, into a 3 m (10 ft) deep gully where she crashed on rocks breaking both ski poles, a ski tip, and sustained five broken ribs along with a pneumothorax. The start time for her qualifying round was pushed back, but she collapsed in pain after qualifying and was taken to hospital to be x-rayed.  The ultrasound failed to show the rib fractures.  Thus, she returned to the course and, despite the agonizing pain, won her quarterfinal and just got through the semifinal as a lucky loser.  During the semifinal, one of the broken ribs pierced her lung, collapsing it.  Despite this and the excruciating pain, she finished third to win the bronze medal in the final, the first individual Winter Olympic medal for Slovenia in 16 years. She earned the highest praise from other skiers, staff and the media for her amazing bravery as she attended the medal giving ceremony with a tube in her chest to relieve pneumothorax. She said at the press conference afterward "Today, this is not a bronze. This is a gold with little diamonds on it".

Two days after the race she was awarded with the Golden Order for Services by the President of Slovenia Danilo Türk. On February 26 it was announced that Petra Majdič and Joannie Rochette are the two Olympians to receive the Terry Fox Award, the purpose of which is to honour an Olympian, who touched the world with courage, humility and extraordinary athletic abilities at the 2010 Games.

After an inspiring Olympic performance, anecdotal factoids had appeared amongst her supporters, all including Majdič herself and Chuck Norris, a typical one being "When Chuck Norris can't go on, Petra Majdič perseveres!".

On 11 January 2011, she was proclaimed the Slovenian Woman of the Year for 2010. The award is conferred each year by the readers of Jana, the oldest women's magazine in Slovenia.

2011 comeback

Due to the extent of her injury, many wrote Majdič off, while some were convinced that she would retire. Her coach Ivan Hudač persuaded her to continue with her career for at least another year and after a successful preparation period she was fit enough to start the 2010–11 season along with other top skiers. It took Majdič only two World Cup races to get back to the podium, she was second in 1.2 km classic sprint of Kuusamo. She was unable to win any races in November and December, but raised her form and won three races in January. She moved on to win a bronze medal in freestyle sprint of the FIS Nordic World Ski Championships 2011 in Oslo. She won yet another World Cup sprint in March, her twenty-fourth career win and third in Stockholm. With that win Majdič clinched her third Sprint title.

She retired from competitive skiing on 20 March 2011, wearing the "Goodbye, I love you" sign on her backside. Justyna Kowalczyk also appeared with a "Goodbye Petra" sign on her head during that same race.

Cross-country skiing results
All results are sourced from the International Ski Federation (FIS).

Olympic Games
 1 medal – (1 bronze)

World Championships
 2 medals – (1 silver, 1 bronze)

World Cup

Season titles
 3 titles – (3 sprint)

Season standings

Individual podiums
 24 victories – (16 , 8 ) 
 49 podiums – (32 , 17 )

References

References

 Official website of Petra Majdič
 
 
 

1979 births
Living people
Olympic cross-country skiers of Slovenia
Cross-country skiers at the 2002 Winter Olympics
Cross-country skiers at the 2006 Winter Olympics
Cross-country skiers at the 2010 Winter Olympics
Slovenian female cross-country skiers
Olympic bronze medalists for Slovenia
Skiers from Ljubljana
Olympic medalists in cross-country skiing
FIS Nordic World Ski Championships medalists in cross-country skiing
Medalists at the 2010 Winter Olympics
Tour de Ski skiers